The Manobo languages are a group of languages spoken in the Philippines. Their speakers are primarily located around Northern Mindanao, Central Mindanao (presently called Soccsksargen) and Caraga regions where they are natively spoken. Some outlying groups make Manobo geographically discontiguous as other speakers can be located as far as the southern peninsula of Davao Oriental, most of Davao Occidental and coastal areas of Sultan Kudarat. The Kagayanen speakers are the most extremely remote and can be found in certain portions of Palawan.

Languages
Central
East: Dibabawon, Rajah Kabunsuwan, Agusan
South: Ata, Matigsalug (Tigwa); Obo
West: Western Bukidnon, Ilianen
North: Binukid, Kagayanen, Higaonon, Kinamigin
South: Tagabawa, Sarangani, Cotabato

Classification
Elkins (1974:637) classifies the Manobo languages as follows.
Manobo
Northern
Cagayano (of Cagayancillo Island)
Kinamigin (of Camiguin Island), Binukid (of central Mindanao)
(core branch)
Southern
Tagabawa
Sarangani Manobo
Tasaday, Cotabato Manobo
East-West-Central
Western
Obo
Ilianen Manobo
Western Bukidnon Manobo, Livunganen (a dialect spoken in Libungan, north of Midsayap, Cotabato)
East-Central
Eastern
Agusan Manobo
Dibabawon Manobo
Central
Ata of Davao
Matig Salug, Tigwa Manobo

Reconstruction

Elkins (1974) includes a reconstruction of Proto-Manobo, along with 197 reconstructed etyma.

The Proto-Manobo phonemes are (Elkins 1974:616):

Consonants

Vowels

See also
Lumad people

References

 
Greater Central Philippine languages